Oreophrynella weiassipuensis is a species of toads in the family Bufonidae. It is only known from Wei-Assipu-tepui, a tepui on the border between Brazil and Guyana. The holotype was collected in 2000 by a speleological expedition to Wei-Assipu-tepui. No other specimens are known. It is possible that it is present in other localities, but most species of Oreophrynella are endemic to a single mountain.

Description
The holotype, an adult male, measures  in snout–vent length. Its characteristics are well developed post-orbital crests, well-developed webbing in hands and feet, dorsal skin that is minutely granular with scattered large tubercles particularly on the upper eyelids and flanks, and reddish brown dorsal and ventral coloration. The tympanum is absent.

Habitat and conservation
There are no known threats to this species. The Brazilian part of the mountain is within the Monte Roraima National Park.

References

weiassipuensis
Amphibians of Brazil
Amphibians of Guyana
Amphibians described in 2005
Taxa named by Josefa Celsa Señaris
Taxonomy articles created by Polbot
Amphibians of the Tepuis